Natnan may refer to several places in Burma:

Natnan, Homalin
Natnan, Kale